Firestone Country Club is a private golf club in the United States, located in Akron, Ohio. It was a regular stop on the PGA Tour and has hosted the PGA Championship three times. It is the current home of the Bridgestone Senior Players Championship through 2026.

The club comprises three courses—those of the North, South, and West. In 1974 the club hosted three televised golf events: the American Golf Classic, the CBS Golf Classic and the World Series of Golf. No other club has hosted three televised golf events in the same calendar year.

One of four World Golf Championships constituent events, the WGC-Bridgestone Invitational, directed by the International Federation of PGA Tours and sanctioned on the PGA and European Tours, was contested at the club with the final event at the club held in 2018. The North and West courses also serve as the home course for the University of Akron Zips golf team.

History
Harvey Firestone commissioned the club  in 1929 as a park for employees of the Firestone Tire and Rubber Company. Its first course, the South, was designed by Bert Way and opened on August 10, 1929, with Firestone driving the first ball.

The North course was designed by Jones and opened  in 1969. Firestone's West was the last course to be added, opening in 1989. First conceived by Geoffrey Cornish and Brian Silva, it went through a redesign in 2002 by Tom Fazio.

Firestone Country Club was acquired by ClubCorp  in 1981, purchased from the Firestone family.

A driving range was added in 1994 and was the first area of the club open to the public. A nine-hole course, the Raymond C. Firestone, was opened for public play in 1995.

Tournaments
The Rubber City Open was the first tournament held at Firestone, from 1954 through 1959. The PGA Championship has been held at the South Course three times: 1960, 1966, and 1975. This exposure led to a new event, the American Golf Classic, which ran from 1961  through 1976.

Since 1962, the World Series of Golf, now known as the WGC-Bridgestone Invitational, has been held at Firestone, usually on the South course. An unofficial four-man event over 36 holes through 1975, it became a limited field event over 72 holes in 1976.

During the third round of the PGA Championship in 1975, Jack Nicklaus pulled out a remarkable par on the  16th hole, considered to be the hardest hole on Firestone's courses. Trailing Bruce Crampton by four strokes after two rounds, Nicklaus gained eight shots on Saturday to lead by four after 54 holes and won his fourth PGA Championship. Tiger Woods also had a memorable moment on the South course when his "shot in the dark" on the 72nd hole at the WGC event in 2000 ensured victory by eleven strokes. He had won the PGA Championship the previous week for his third consecutive major championship that season.
 
The North course is used less frequently in televised events, but hosted the American Golf Classic in 1976 and the World Series of Golf in 1994.

Holes

Tee boxes
1. Championship – slope: 128, rating: 75.1, 
2. Member – slope: 122, rating: 71.2, 
3. Ladies' – slope: 127, rating: 72.8,

South Course – The Monster
This course was designed from the start to be championship level and has been the host of over 70 professional tournaments. After a triple-bogey at the 16th hole in the third round of the PGA Championship in 1960, Arnold Palmer called it a "monster." The name stayed and struck such a chord with frustrated golfers that the entire South course is now known fondly as "The Monster."

1st Hole, 399 yard, par-4
2nd Hole, 526 yard, par-5
3rd Hole, 442 yard, par-4
4th Hole, 471 yard, par-4  Another long par 4, the second shot is where golfers get themselves into trouble; the height of the green requires quite a bit of lift.
5th Hole, 200 yard, par-3  While still a good length, this par 3 is considered to be one of the easier holes on the course. However, until 1987 NEC World Series of Golf, the full length from championship tee was 234 yards, which was the longest and toughest par 3 in this course.
6th Hole, 469 yard, par-4  Length alone adds a great deal of difficulty to this par 4, often noted to be the most difficult hole on the course.
7th Hole, 219 yard, par-3
8th Hole, 482 yard, par-4
9th Hole, 494 yard, par-4
10th Hole, 410 yard, par-4
11th Hole, 418 yard, par-4
12th Hole, 180 yard, par-3
13th Hole, 471 yard, par-4
14th Hole, 467 yard, par-4
15th Hole, 221 yard, par-3  A long par 3 is difficult enough, but the hidden left bunker proves fatal for many a golfer.
16th Hole, 667 yard, par-5  One of the longest par 5s in existence, its pond in front of the green adds more than its fair share of difficulty to the hole.
17th Hole, 400 yard, par-4
18th Hole, 464 yard, par-4  With a long narrow profile and a green surrounded by bunkers, this is a difficult par 4 to birdie.

North Course
A championship level course, the North is famous for its many lakes and streams. While considered the most scenic course of the three, it has only been host to two tournaments.

1st Hole, 398 yard, par-4
2nd Hole, 387 yard, par-4
3rd Hole, 449 yard, par-4
4th Hole, 423 yard, par-4
5th Hole, 533 yard, par-5
6th Hole, 214 yard, par-3
7th Hole, 534 yard, par-5 Water comes into play if approach shot is hit too long.
8th Hole, 178 yard, par-3
9th Hole, 431 yard, par-4
10th Hole, 364 yard, par-4
11th Hole, 201 yard, par-3 Almost an island green with water surrounding 3 sides of the green.
12th Hole, 427 yard, par-4
13th Hole, 441 yard, par-4
14th Hole, 441 yard, par-4
15th Hole, 341 yard, par-4
16th Hole, 560 yard, par-5 Water comes into play if approach shot is hit too long.
17th Hole, 218 yard, par-3 Another hole with water surrounding 3 sides of the green.
18th Hole, 520 yard, par-5

West Course
The final championship course on the grounds and host to the annual Ohio Senior Open.

1st Hole, 444 yard, par-4
2nd Hole, 392 yard, par-4
3rd Hole, 211 yard, par-3
4th Hole, 324 yard, par-4
5th Hole, 356 yard, par-4
6th Hole, 467 yard, par-4
7th Hole, 191 yard, par-3
8th Hole, 484 yard, par-4
9th Hole, 625 yard, par-5
10th Hole, 426 yard, par-4
11th Hole, 448 yard, par-4
12th Hole, 170 yard, par-3
13th Hole, 492 yard, par-5
14th Hole, 147 yard, par-3
15th Hole, 476 yard, par-4
16th Hole, 244 yard, par-3
17th Hole, 525 yard, par-5
18th Hole, 482 yard, par-4

References

External links

Golf clubs and courses in Ohio
Golf clubs and courses designed by Robert Trent Jones
Buildings and structures in Akron, Ohio
Sports venues in Akron, Ohio
College golf clubs and courses in the United States
1929 establishments in Ohio
Sports venues completed in 1929